Kórdrengir are an Icelandic football club based in Reykjavík, Iceland.

History
The club was founded in 2017. It first participated in the Icelandic tier-5 league, 4. deild karla, in 2017. In 2018 they achieved promotion to 3. deild karla, in 2019 to 2. deild karla and in 2020 to 1. deild karla.

Players

Current squad

Stats history
{|class="wikitable"
|-bgcolor="#efefef"
! Season
! League
! Pos.
! Pl.
! W
! D
! L
! GS
! GA
! P
!Cup
!Notes
|-
|2017
|4. deild
|align=right bgcolor=gold|1
|align=right|14||align=right|11||align=right|1||align=right|2
|align=right|41||align=right|19||align=right|34
||1/64 finals
| 3rd place in promotion play-offs
|-
|2018
|4. deild
|align=right bgcolor=gold|1
|align=right|12||align=right|8||align=right|1||align=right|3
|align=right|26||align=right|12||align=right|25
||1/32 finals
| Promoted to 3. deild
|-
|2019
|3. deild
|align=right bgcolor=gold|1
|align=right|22||align=right|17||align=right|3||align=right|2
|align=right|63||align=right|27||align=right|54
||1/16 finals
| Promoted to 2. deild
|-
|2020
|2. deild
|align=right bgcolor=gold|1
|align=right|20||align=right|14||align=right|4||align=right|2
|align=right|45||align=right|13||align=right|46
||1/16 finals
| Promoted to 1. deild
|-
|2021
|1. deild
|align=right|4
|align=right|22||align=right|11||align=right|6||align=right|5
|align=right|39||align=right|28||align=right|39
||1/32 finals
|}

Overall
Seasons spent at Level 1 of the Icelandic football league system: 0
Seasons spent at Level 2 of the football league system: 1
Seasons spent at Level 3 of the football league system: 1
Seasons spent at Level 4 of the football league system: 1
Seasons spent at Level 5 of the football league system: 2

As of season 2021.

Top scorers by season

Players in bold are currently playing for Kórdrengir.

Former notable players
Players who have played for Kórdrengir and earned international caps at senior level. Correct as of 7 February 2020.

Managerial history

Honours
4. deild karla
 Third Place (1): 2018
3. deild karla
 Winners (1): 2019

References

External links
 Official Website

Football clubs in Iceland
Association football clubs established in 2017
2017 establishments in Iceland